Pepin the Short (– 24 September 768), was King of the Franks from 751 until his death in 768. He was the first Carolingian to become king.

Pepin was the son of the Frankish prince Charles Martel and his wife Rotrude. Pepin's upbringing was distinguished by the ecclesiastical education he had received from the Christian monks of the Abbey Church of St. Denis, near Paris. Succeeding his father as the Mayor of the Palace in 741, Pepin reigned over Francia jointly with his elder brother, Carloman. Pepin ruled in Neustria, Burgundy, and Provence, while his older brother Carloman established himself in Austrasia, Alemannia, and Thuringia. The brothers were active in suppressing revolts led by the Bavarians, Aquitanians, Saxons, and the Alemanni in the early years of their reign. In 743, they ended the Frankish interregnum by choosing Childeric III, who was to be the last Merovingian monarch, as figurehead King of the Franks.

Being well disposed towards the Christian Church and Papacy on account of their ecclesiastical upbringing, Pepin and Carloman continued their father's work in supporting Saint Boniface in reforming the Frankish church, and evangelizing the Saxons. After Carloman, who was an intensely pious man, retired to religious life in 747, Pepin became the sole ruler of the Franks. He suppressed a revolt led by his half-brother Grifo, and succeeded in becoming the undisputed master of all Francia. Giving up pretense, Pepin then forced Childeric into a monastery and had himself proclaimed King of the Franks with the support of Pope Zachary in 751. The decision was not supported by all members of the Carolingian family and Pepin had to put down a revolt led by Carloman's son, Drogo, and again by Grifo.

As King of the Franks, Pepin embarked on an ambitious program to expand his power. He reformed the legislation of the Franks and continued the ecclesiastical reforms of Boniface. Pepin also intervened in favour of the Papacy of Stephen II against the Lombards in Italy. In the midsummer of 754, Stephen II anointed Pepin afresh, together with his two sons, Charles and Carloman. The ceremony took place in the Abbey Church of St. Denis, and the Pope formally forbade the Franks ever to elect as king anyone who was not of the sacred race of Pepin. He also bestowed upon Pepin and his sons the title of Patrician of Rome. Pepin was able to secure several cities, which he then gave to the Pope as part of the Donation of Pepin. This formed the legal basis for the Papal States in the Middle Ages. The Byzantine Greeks, keen to make good relations with the growing power of the Frankish Empire, gave Pepin the title of Patricius.

In wars of expansion for the Frankish realm, Pepin conquered Septimania from the Umayyad and Andalusian Muslims and defeated them at the siege of Narbonne in 759, and proceeded to subjugate the southern realms by repeatedly defeating Waiofar and his Gascon troops, after which the Gascon and Aquitanian lords saw no option but to pledge loyalty to the Franks. Pepin was, however, troubled by the relentless revolts of the Saxons and the Bavarians. He campaigned tirelessly in Germania as well, but the final subjugation of the Germanic tribes was left to his successors.

Pepin died in 768 and was succeeded by his sons Charlemagne and Carloman. Although unquestionably one of the most powerful and successful rulers of his time, Pepin's reign is largely overshadowed by that of his more famous son, Charlemagne.

Assumption of power
Pepin's father Charles Martel died in 741. He divided the rule of the Frankish kingdom between Pepin and his elder brother, Carloman, his surviving sons by his first wife: Carloman became Mayor of the Palace of Austrasia, Pepin became Mayor of the Palace of Neustria. Grifo, Charles's son by his second wife, Swanahild (also known as Swanhilde), demanded a share in the inheritance, but he was besieged in Laon, forced to surrender and imprisoned in a monastery by his two half-brothers.

In the Frankish realm the unity of the kingdom was essentially connected with the person of the king. So Carloman, to secure this unity, raised the Merovingian Childeric to the throne (743).  Then in 747 Carloman resolved to entering a monastery after years of consideration. This left Francia in the hands of Pepin as sole mayor of the palace and dux et princeps Francorum.

At the time of Carloman's retirement, Grifo escaped his imprisonment and fled to Duke Odilo of Bavaria, who was married to Hiltrude, Pepin's sister. Pepin put down the renewed revolt led by his half-brother and succeeded in completely restoring the boundaries of the kingdom.

Under the reorganization of Francia by Charles Martel, the dux et princeps Francorum was the commander of the armies of the kingdom, in addition to his administrative duties as mayor of the palace.

First Carolingian king  

As mayor of the palace, Pepin was formally subject to the decisions of Childeric III, who had only the title of king, with no power. Since Pepin had control over the magnates and actually had the power of a king, he now addressed to Pope Zachary a suggestive question:
In regard to the kings of the Franks who no longer possess the royal power: is this state of things proper?

Hard pressed by the Lombards, Pope Zachary welcomed this move by the Franks to end an intolerable condition and lay the constitutional foundations for the exercise of the royal power. The Pope replied that such a state of things is not proper. Under these circumstances, the wielder of actual power should be called King. After this decision, Childeric III was deposed and confined to a monastery. He was the last of the Merovingians.

Pepin was then elected King of the Franks by an assembly of Frankish nobles, with a large portion of his army on hand. The earliest account of his election and anointing is the Clausula de Pippino, written around 767. Meanwhile, Grifo continued his rebellion, but was eventually killed in the battle of Saint-Jean-de-Maurienne in 753.

Pepin was assisted by his friend Vergilius of Salzburg, an Irish monk who probably used a copy of the "Collectio canonum Hibernensis" (an Irish collection of canon law) to advise him to receive royal unction to assist his recognition as king. Anointed a first time in 751 in Soissons, Pepin added to his power after Pope Stephen II traveled all the way to Paris to anoint him a second time in a lavish ceremony at the Basilica of St Denis in 754, bestowing upon him the additional title of Patricius Romanorum (Patrician of the Romans). This was the first recorded crowning of a civil ruler by a Pope. As life expectancies were short in those days, and Pepin wanted family continuity, the Pope also anointed Pepin's sons, Charles (eventually known as Charlemagne), who was 12, and Carloman, who was 3.

The significance of the ceremony of anointment is visible in that it was newly adopted by the Pope and was unheard of in Rome. This, together with granting the title of Patrician of the Romans, which was connected to the role of Defensor Civitatis (protector of oppressed citizens), meant that Pippin was now designated as the defender of the Church.

Expansion of the Frankish realm

Pepin's first major act as king was to go to war against the Lombard king Aistulf, who had expanded into the ducatus Romanus. After a meeting with Pope Stephen II at Ponthion, Pepin forced the Lombard king to return property seized from the Church. He confirmed the papacy in possession of Ravenna and the Pentapolis, the so-called Donation of Pepin, whereby the Papal States were established and the temporal reign of the papacy officially began. At about 752, he turned his attention to Septimania. The new king headed south in a military expedition down the Rhone valley and received the submission of eastern Septimania (i.e. Nîmes, Maguelone, Beziers and Agde) after securing count Ansemund's allegiance. The Frankish king went on to invest Narbonne, the main Umayyad stronghold in Septimania, but could not capture it from the Iberian Muslims until seven years later in 759, when they were driven out to Hispania.

Aquitaine still remained under Waiofar's Gascon-Aquitanian rule, however, and beyond Frankish reach. Duke Waiofar appears to have confiscated Church lands, maybe distributing them among his troops. In 760, after conquering the Roussillon from the Muslims and denouncing Waiofar's actions, Pepin moved his troops over to Toulouse and Albi, ravaged with fire and sword most of Aquitaine, and, in retaliation, counts loyal to Waiofar ravaged Burgundy. Pepin, in turn, besieged the Aquitanian-held towns and strongholds of Bourbon, Clermont, Chantelle, Bourges and Thouars, defended by Waiofar's Gascon troops, who were overcome, captured and deported into northern France with their children and wives.

In 763, Pepin advanced further into the heart of Waiofar's domains and captured major strongholds (Poitiers, Limoges, Angoulême, etc.), after which Waiofar counterattacked and war became bitter. Pepin opted to spread terror, burning villas, destroying vineyards and depopulating monasteries. By 765, the brutal tactics seemed to pay off for the Franks, who destroyed resistance in central Aquitaine and devastated the whole region. The city of Toulouse was conquered by Pepin in 767 as was Waiofar's capital of Bordeaux.

As a result, Aquitanian nobles and Gascons from beyond the Garonne too saw no option but to accept a pro-Frankish peace treaty (Fronsac, c. 768). Waiofar escaped but was assassinated by his own frustrated followers in 768.

Legacy

Pepin died during a campaign, in 768 at the age of 54. He was interred in the Basilica of Saint Denis in modern-day Metropolitan Paris.  His wife Bertrada was also interred there in 783. Charlemagne rebuilt the Basilica in honor of his parents and placed markers at the entrance.

The Frankish realm was divided according to the Salic law between his two sons: Charlemagne and Carloman I.

Historical opinion often seems to regard him as the lesser son and lesser father of two greater men, though a great man in his own right.  He continued to build up the heavy cavalry which his father had begun. He maintained the standing army that his father had found necessary to protect the realm and form the core of its full army in wartime. He not only contained the Spanish Muslims as his father had, but drove them out of what is now France and, as important, he managed to subdue the Aquitanians and the Gascons after three generations of on-off clashes, so opening the gate to central and southern Gaul and Muslim Spain. He continued his father's expansion of the Frankish church (missionary work in Germany and Scandinavia) and the institutional infrastructure (feudalism) that would prove the backbone of medieval Europe.

His rule was historically important and of great benefit to the Franks as a people.  Pepin's assumption of the crown, and the title of Patrician of Rome, were harbingers of his son's imperial coronation. He made the Carolingians the ruling dynasty of the Franks and the foremost power of Europe. Known as a great conqueror, he was undefeated during his lifetime.

Family
Pepin married Leutberga from the Danube region. They had five children. She was repudiated some time after the birth of Charlemagne and her children were sent to convents.

In 741, Pepin married Bertrada, daughter of Caribert of Laon. They are known to have had eight children, at least three of whom survived to adulthood:
 Charles (Charlemagne) (2 April 742 – 28 January 814)
 Carloman (751 – 4 December 771)
 Pepin (756–762)
 Gisela (757–810)
 Berthe, died young
 Adelais (Adelaide), died young, buried in Metz
 Chrothais (Rothaide), died young, buried in Metz.

Notes

References

Bibliography

External links 

 
 Document by Pepin for Fulda Abbey, 760, .

|-

714 births
768 deaths
Frankish warriors
Mayors of the Palace
Monarchs killed in action
Burials at the Basilica of Saint-Denis
Carolingian dynasty
People from Liège
8th-century Frankish kings